The Baltic Champions Cup is a Baltic football club tournament, launched in 2006 before going on hiatus until 2011. The Champions of Estonia, Latvia and Lithuania leagues take part in the competition which is played indoor. The competition is played over three consecutive days with each club playing each other once. The winner is decided by a league table.

Winners

References

2006 in Estonian football
2006 in Latvian football
2006 in Lithuanian football
2011 in Estonian football
2011 in Latvian football
2011 in Lithuanian football
Football cup competitions in Estonia
Football cup competitions in Lithuania
Football cup competitions in Latvia
Defunct football competitions in Latvia
Indoor soccer competitions
Sport in the Baltic states
Recurring sporting events established in 2006
Recurring sporting events disestablished in 2011